An Historical Account of Two Notable Corruptions of Scripture is a dissertation by the English mathematician and scholar Isaac Newton. This was sent in a letter to John Locke on 14 November 1690. In fact, Newton may have been in dialogue with Locke about this issue much earlier. While living in France, Locke made a journal entry, dated 20 December 1679, where he indicates that while visiting the library at Saint-Germain-des-Prés he saw:

Newton's work also built upon the textual work of Richard Simon and his own research. The text was first published in English in 1754, 27 years after his death. The account claimed to review all the textual evidence available from ancient sources on two disputed Bible passages: 1 John 5:7 and 1 Timothy 3:16.

Newton describes this letter as "an account of what the reading has been in all ages, and what steps it has been changed, as far as I can hitherto determine by records", and "a criticism concerning a text of Scripture". He blames "the Roman church" for many abuses in the world and accuses it of "pious frauds". He adds that "the more learned and quick-sighted men, as Luther, Erasmus, Bullinger, Grotius, and some others, would not dissemble their knowledge".

Newton's work on this issue was part of a larger effort of scholars studying the Bible and finding that, for example, the opinion that Trinity is not found in the original manuscripts in explicit view. Such scholarship was suppressed, and Newton kept his discoveries private.

1 John 5:7

In the King James Version of the New Testament, 1 John 5:7 reads:

Using the writings of the early Church Fathers, the Greek and Latin manuscripts and the testimony of the earliest extant manuscripts of the Bible, of the Bible, Newton claims to have demonstrated that the words "in heaven, the Father, the Word, and the Holy Ghost: and these three are one", that support the Trinity doctrine, did not appear in the original Greek Scriptures. He then attempts to demonstrate that the purportedly spurious reading crept into the Latin versions, first as a marginal note, and later into the text itself. He noted that "the Æthiopic, Syriac, Greek, Armenian, Georgian and Slavonic versions, still in use in the several Eastern nations, Ethiopia, Egypt, Syria, Mesopotamia, and Eastern European Armenia, Georgia, Muscovy, and some others, are strangers to this reading". He argued that it was first taken into a Greek text in 1515 by Cardinal Ximenes. Finally, Newton considered the sense and context of the verse, concluding that removing the interpolation makes "the sense plain and natural, and the argument full and strong; but if you insert the testimony of 'the Three in Heaven' you interrupt and spoil it." Today most versions of the Bible are from the Critical Text and omit this verse, or retain it as only a marginal reading. However, some argue that the verse is not a later corruption.

1 Timothy 3:16
The shorter portion of Newton's dissertation was concerned with 1 Timothy 3:16, which reads (in the King James Version):

Newton argued that, by a small alteration in the Greek text, the word "God" was substituted to make the phrase read "God was manifest in the flesh" instead of "which was manifested in the flesh". He attempted to demonstrate that early Church writers in referring to the verse knew nothing of such an alteration. This change increases textual support for trinitarianism, a doctrine to which Newton did not subscribe. In other words, Bible manuscripts closest to the  said 'who' and not 'God' in verse 16.

Summary of both passages
Newton concludes: "If the ancient churches in debating and deciding the greatest mysteries of religion, knew nothing of these two texts, I understand not, why we should be so fond of them now the debates are over." With minor exceptions, it was only in the nineteenth century that Bible translations appeared changing these passages. Modern versions of the Bible from the Critical Text usually omit the addition to 1 John 5:7, but some place it in a footnote, with a comment indicating that "it is not found in the earliest manuscripts". Modern translations of 1 Timothy 3:16 following the Critical Text now typically replace "God" with "He" or "He who", while the literal Emphasized has "who".

A number of papers in the years following responded to Newton, notably John Berriman in 1741, who had seen at least some of Newton's text prior to publication. Later, Frederick Nolan in 1815, Ebenezer Henderson in 1830 and John William Burgon in the Revision Revised in 1883 all contributed substantially to the verse discussion.

Historical background
Newton did not publish these findings during his lifetime, likely due to the political climate. Those who wrote against the doctrine of the Trinity were subject to persecution in England. The Blasphemy Act 1697 made it an offence to deny one of the persons of the Trinity to be God, punishable with loss of office and employment on the first occasion, further legal ramifications on the second occasion, and imprisonment without hope for bail on the third occasion. Newton's friend William Whiston (translator of the works of Josephus) lost his professorship at Cambridge for this reason in 1711. In 1693 a pamphlet attacking the Trinity was burned by order of the House of Lords, and the next year its printer and author were prosecuted. In 1697 Thomas Aikenhead, an eighteen-year-old student charged with denying the Trinity, was hanged at Edinburgh, Scotland.

The dissertation was published in 1754.

See also
 Isaac Newton's religious views
 Trinitarianism in the Church Fathers

Notes

References

Further reading
 John Berriman Theos ephanerōthē en sarki (romanized form) or A critical dissertation upon 1 Tim. iii. 16: wherein rules are laid down to distinguish in various readings which is genuine : an account is given of above a hundred Greek manuscripts of St. Paul's Epistles (many of them not heretofore collated) : the writings of the Greek and Latin Fathers and the ancient versions are examin'd and the common reading of that text, God was manifest in the flesh, is prov'd to be the true one : being the substance of eight sermons preach'd at the Lady Moyer's lecture in the Cathedral Church of St. Paul, London, in the years 1737 and 1738
 The History of the Works of the Learned 1741 p. 29–144 (A very readable review of the John Berriman book that goes chapter by chapter.)
 Ebenezer Henderson The Great Mystery of Godliness Incontrovertible; or, Sir Isaac Newton and the Socinians foiled in the attempt to prove a corruption in the text, 1 Tim. III. 16, [theòs ephanerōthē en sarki]: containing a review of the charges brought against the passage; an examination of the various readings; and a confirmation of that in the received text on principles of general and biblical criticism , 1830
 John William Burgon Revision Revised "GOD was manifested in the flesh" Shown to be the true reading of 1 Timothy III.16 A Dissertation, 1883 p. 424–501

External links
 An Historical Account of Two Notable Corruptions of Scripture: in A Letter To A Friend, Google Books (digitised from Ghent University's copy of John Green's 1841 printing of the 1785 publication by Samuel Horsley)
 Various drafts and copies of the Two Notable Corruptions of Scripture and related material, The Newton Project

Biblical criticism
17th-century Christian texts
Works by Isaac Newton
1690 books
1754 books
Books published posthumously